Qaleh Shaban (also Romanized as Qal‘eh Sha‘ban; also known as Kalāteh-ye Sha‘bān, Kalāteh-ye Sha‘ban, and Tānīr Lū) is a village in Badranlu Rural District, in the Central District of Bojnord County, North Khorasan Province, Iran. At the 2006 census, its population was 259, in 61 families.

References 

Populated places in Bojnord County